Mohammad Samir Haddad is a Syrian politician from the Arab Democratic Union Party who served as Minister of State for Southern Development Affairs in the First Hussein Arnous government.

References 

Living people

Year of birth missing (living people)
21st-century Syrian politicians
Government ministers of Syria